The Escambia County Sheriff's Office (ECSO) or Escambia Sheriff's Office (ESO) is the primary law enforcement agency of unincorporated Escambia County and the town of Century. ECSO is headed by a sheriff, who serves a four-year term and is elected in a partisan election. The current sheriff is Chip Simmons.

Department Structure
The Escambia County Sheriff's Office is headed by a sheriff. Currently, the Sheriff is Chip W. Simmons who replaced former Sheriff David Morgan in 2021.  Simmons was previously Chief of Police for the City of Pensacola, Florida, in Escambia County, Florida.

Chief Deputy
The rank of chief deputy is the second-highest rank in the Office, reporting directly to the Sheriff. Each chief deputy serves as a member of the senior command staff and assists the sheriff in managing civilian and commissioned personnel.

Precincts
Central Booking Division: 1700 West Leonard Street, Pensacola
Pensacola Beach (1st Precinct) Substation: 43 Fort Pickens Road, Pensacola Beach
Big Lagoon (2nd Precinct) Substation: 12950 Gulf Beach Highway, Pensacola 
South (Warrington) Pensacola (3rd Precinct) Substation: 20 North Navy Blvd., Pensacola 
North Pensacola (4th Precinct) Substation: 97 W. Hood Drive. Pensacola 
Cantonment/Molino (5th Precinct) Substation: 5844 North Hwy 29, Molino 
Century (6th Precinct) Substation: 7500 North Century Blvd., Century

Rank structure

Before October 2013, the sheriff had control over the Escambia County Jail, located at 2935 North L Street, but after a U.S. Department of Justice investigation reported that the jail did not provide required minimum services and was chronically understaffed, the jail was moved under the direct supervision of the County Commissioners. In April 2014 a natural gas explosion rocked the jail, causing some to reconsider the wisdom of direct Commission administration.

History

The office of sheriff was established with the transfer from Spain in 1821. The Spanish title Alguazil was initially used for the office. Henri Peire, a former privateer and colonel in the United States Army, was named the first sheriff by General Andrew Jackson.

On 23 August 1877, the notorious outlaw John Wesley Hardin was arrested by Sheriff William H. Hutchinson working with Texas Rangers Lt. John B. Armstrong and Jack R. Duncan, accompanied by nine deputies.

In the 21st century relations between the Escambia County Sheriff's Office and federal law enforcement were occasionally strained. In 2005 under Sheriff McNesby, disagreements over the release of information in drug cases led to a monthlong stand-off between the sheriff's office and the U.S. Attorney's office, which was only settled by the intervention of three federal judges. In September 2012, the Civil Rights Division completed its report on excessive use of force by the Escambia Sheriff's Office, that together with the Department of Justice's 2013 report on the inadequate status of the Escambia jail further exacerbated relations. In February 2015 Sheriff Morgan severed ties with both the federal Joint Terrorism Task Force headed by the FBI, and the U.S. Marshal's Regional Fugitive Task Force, pulling the deputies assigned to those duties. Again the issue was one of information dissemination. In December 2015 agreement was reached with the U.S. Attorney's office in Tallahassee to rejoin both task forces.

Controversy arose in 2013 when ECSO deputies shot a 60-year-old unarmed man in his driveway.

The canines of the sheriff's office received national honors at the U.S. Police Canine Association National Police Dog Trials in October 2014, where they had the top team scores.

Before leaving office in early 2021, Sheriff David Morgan used $75,000 in office funds to commission a life-sized metal statue of himself. He said his intent was use the figure of himself saluting as an addition to the office's memorial to fallen officers. The new Sheriff Chip Simmons declined to install the statue in front of the office's main entrance.

List of sheriffs

Henri Peire 1821
Charles Bradford 1821–1822
William Davison 1823–1826
Charles Mifflin 1827
Henry Wilson	1828
Adam Gordon	1829
James Pendleton	1829–1830
Florencio Commyns	1830–1837
Jesse Allen	1837–1840
Peter Woodbine	1840–1842
Ebenezer Dorr IV	1842–1846
Mortimar Bright	1846
Angus Nicholson	1846–1847
Antoine Collins	1847–1851
Francis de la Rua	1851–1852
Francis Maura	1852–1854
Joseph Crosby	1854–1857
William Jordan	1857–1859
Daniel Williams	1859–1865
James B. Roberts	1865–1868
George Wentworth	1868–1870
Henry Campbell	1870
E. R. Payne	1870
George Wells	1870–1874
J. N. Coombs	1874–1875
A. M. Green	1875–1877
W. H. Hutchison	1877–1885
Joseph Wilkins	1885–1893
George E. Smith	1893–1903
James C. Van Pelt	1903–1913
A. Cary Ellis	1913–1917
James C. Van Pelt	1917–1919
Hurdis S. Whitaker	1919–1921
A. Cary Ellis	1921–1923
Mose S. Penton	1923–1932
H. E. Gandy	1932–1941
Howard L. Mayes 1941–1945
R. L. Kendrick	1945–1957
Emmett Shelby	1957–1961
Bill Davis	1961–1970
Royal Untreiner 1970–1981
J. "Vince" Sealy 1981–1989
Charlie Johnson 1989–1993
Jim Lowman	1993–2001
Ron McNesby	2001–2009
David Morgan	2009–2021
Chip Simmons  2021-Present

Sixteen policemen from this agency have died in the line of duty.

Television
The sheriff's office produces a television show, every other Tuesday, entitled Your Escambia County Sheriff’s Report. It is broadcast on Blab TV (Cox Channel 1006).

In 2015 the Escambia sheriff's office was twice featured on the reality program Cops.

See also 

 Pensacola metropolitan area

Notes and references

External links
 
 
 

Sheriffs' departments of Florida
Escambia County, Florida
1840s establishments in Florida Territory
Government agencies established in 1845